Slipperiness is when a surface has a low coefficient of friction, allowing objects to glide across the surface. People walking on slippery surfaces are likely to slip or fall. A surface can for example be slippery due to it being wet, or due to it being icy. There are several competing theories about why ice is slippery.

Road slipperiness is a major area of road safety, but various means have also been developed to measure walkway and deck slipperiness in order to develop health and safety standards.

See also 

Floor slip resistance testing
Ice cleats, used to prevent slipping when walking on icy roads

References

Safety
Friction